Kolugan (also Romanized as Kolūgān; also known as Golūkān) is a village in Rudbar-e Qasran Rural District, Rudbar-e Qasran District, Shemiranat County, Tehran Province, Iran. At the 2006 census, its population was 380, in 108 families.

References 

Populated places in Shemiranat County